Rushden Academy is an Academy school in Rushden, Northamptonshire, which was founded in 1977.  The school was formerly the Chichele College for Girls until 1991 when it was amalgamated to become The Rushden School, rebranding as the Rushden Community College in 2005 and as Rushden Academy in 2014.  There were 784 students in Years 7 to 13 on roll in the 2018-2019 college year, including the Sixth Form which is shared with two other local schools.

Achievement

The school was found to be inadequate by Ofsted during their last visit in July 2016 and was placed in special measures.

Percentage of students achieving 5+ GCSEs including Maths and English 
2013: 39% 
2014: 40%
2015: 37%

Progress 8 score 
 2016: -0.82  
 2017: -0.78  
 2018: -0.24  
 2019: -0.38

Feeder Schools
The College gains over 95% of its Year 7 students from ten local feeder schools.

 South Rushden: Whitefriars Primary School, South End Junior School and Rushden Primary Academy
 North Rushden: Denfield Park Primary School
 Central Rushden: Alfred Street Junior School
 West Rushden: Newton Road School
 Higham Ferrers: Higham Ferrers Junior School and Henry Chichele Primary School
Village: St Lawrence VA Primary School and Christopher Reeves VA Primary School

Sixth form provision
The college's sixth form is part of the East Northamptonshire College with two other local schools (Huxlow Academy and The Ferrers School).

Academy Status
On 1 December 2012 the Rushden Community College became an academy with sponsorship through The Education Fellowship Trust based in Northamptonshire, with partners including John Lewis and Waitrose.  In 2015 the Trust was told by the Department of Education that it must urgently improve students' achievement.  In March 2017 The Education Fellowship gave up all 12 of its schools after financial problems and concerns regarding poor outcomes for pupils. On 1 May 2018 the Academy came under the control of the Tove Learning Trust.

References

External links
Rushden Community College website
The Education Fellowship Website

Academies in North Northamptonshire
Educational institutions established in 1977
Rushden
1977 establishments in England
Secondary schools in North Northamptonshire